Giuseppe Chiappella (28 September 1924 – 26 December 2009) was an Italian football midfielder and manager. He played for Redaelli Milano, Stradellina, and Pisa, but is most famous for making over 300 appearances for Fiorentina. He represented Italy at international level in 17 games between 1953 and 1957.

After Chiappella retired from professional football, he went on to management; he was at the helm at some of Italy's top clubs such as Fiorentina, Napoli and Internazionale.

Honours

Player
Fiorentina
Serie A: 1955–56

Manager
Fiorentina
Coppa Italia: 1965–66
Mitropa Cup: 1966

Individual 
ACF Fiorentina Hall of Fame: 2012

References

External links
 
 

1924 births
2009 deaths
Footballers from Milan
Association football midfielders
Italian footballers
Italy international footballers
ACF Fiorentina players
Italian football managers
Hellas Verona F.C. managers
ACF Fiorentina managers
Pisa S.C. players
Inter Milan managers
Cagliari Calcio players
S.S.C. Napoli managers
Serie A players
Serie B players
Serie A managers